The Minister of State for Northern Ireland is a mid-level position in the Northern Ireland Office in the British government. It is currently held by Steve Baker, who took the office on 7 September 2022.

Responsibilities 
The minister has the following ministerial responsibilities:

Driving economic and domestic policy 
Long term economic recovery from COVID-19 
Promotion of the economy, levelling up and innovation - including City Deals and the Shared Prosperity Fund
Leading the department’s work on the most critical constitution and rights issues in NI
 
Supporting the Secretary of State in their responsibilities, including: 
Legacy stakeholder engagement 
Strengthening and sustaining the Union in Northern Ireland 
Vital security casework
Building substantive relationships across sectors and communities 
Leading workstreams on New Decade, New Approach agreement and the NI Protocol

Ministers of State for Northern Ireland 
{| class="wikitable"
! colspan=2|Name
! Portrait
! Entered office
! Left office
! Political party
! Notes
|-
! style="background-color: " | 
| Paul Channon
| 
| 26 March 1972               
| 5 November 1972
| Conservative
|
|-
! style="background-color: " | 
| The Lord Windlesham
| 
| 26 March 1972                
| 5 June 1973
| Conservative
|
|-
! style="background-color: " | 
| William van Straubenzee
| 
| 5 November 1972                  
| 4 March 1974
| Conservative
|
|-
! style="background-color: " | 
| David Howell
| 
| 5 November 1972                  
| 8 January 1974
| Conservative
|
|-
! style="background-color: " | 
| Stan Orme
| 
| 7 March 1974                    
| 8 April 1976
| Labour
|
|-
! style="background-color: " | 
| Roland Moyle
| 
| 27 June 1974                      
| 10 September 1976
| Labour
|
|-
! style="background-color: " | 
| Don Concannon
| 
| 14 April 1976                        
| 4 May 1979
| Labour
|
|-
! style="background-color: " | 
| The Lord Melchett
| 
| 10 September 1976                          
| 4 May 1979
| Labour
|
|-
! style="background-color: " | 
| Michael Alison
| 
| 7 May 1979                            
| 15 September 1981
| Conservative
|
|-
! style="background-color: " | 
| Hugh Rossi
| 
| 7 May 1979                              
| 5 January 1981
| Conservative
|
|-
! style="background-color: " | 
| The Earl of Gowrie
| 
| 15 September 1981                              
| 10 June 1983
| Conservative
|
|-
! style="background-color: " | 
| Adam Butler
| 
| 5 January 1981  
| 11 September 1984                              
| Conservative
|
|-
! style="background-color: " | 
| The Earl of Mansfield
| 
| 13 June 1983    
| 12 April 1984                              
| Conservative
|
|-
! style="background-color: " | 
| Rhodes Boyson
| 
| 11 September 1984  
| 10 September 1986                                  
| Conservative
|
|-
! style="background-color: " | 
| Nicholas Scott
| 
| 10 September 1986    
| 13 June 1987                                  
| Conservative
|
|-
! style="background-color: " | 
| John Stanley
| 
| 13 June 1987      
| 25 July 1988                                  
| Conservative
|
|-
! style="background-color: " | 
| Ian Stewart
| 
| 25 July 1988        
| 25 July 1989                                  
| Conservative
|
|-
! style="background-color: " | 
| John Cope
| 
| 25 July 1989          
| 28 November 1990                                  
| Conservative
|
|-
! style="background-color: " | 
| Brian Mawhinney
| 
| 28 November 1990            
| 14 April 1992                                  
| Conservative
|
|-
! style="background-color: " | 
| The Lord Belstead
| 
| 28 November 1990             
| 14 April 1992                                  
| Conservative
|
|-
! style="background-color: " | 
| Robert Atkins
| 
| 14 April 1992               
| 11 January 1994                                  
| Conservative
|
|-
! style="background-color: " | 
| Michael Mates
| 
| 15 April 1992                 
| 24 June 1993                                  
| Conservative
|
|-
! style="background-color: " | 
| John Wheeler
| 
| 25 June 1993                   
| 2 May 1997                                  
| Conservative
|
|-
! style="background-color: " | 
| Michael Ancram
| 
| 11 January 1994                 
| 2 May 1997                                  
| Conservative
|
|-
! style="background-color: " | 
| Adam Ingram
| 
| 2 May 1997                   
| 7 June 2001                                  
| Labour
|
|-
! style="background-color: " | 
| Jane Kennedy
| 
| 7 June 2001                    
| 13 June 2003                                  
| Labour
|
|-
! style="background-color: " | 
| John Spellar
| 
| 13 June 2003                      
| 10 May 2005                                  
| Labour
|
|-
! style="background-color: " | 
| David Hanson
| 
| 11 May 2005                        
| 8 May 2007                                  
| Labour
|
|-
! style="background-color: " | 
| Paul Goggins
| 
| 8 May 2007                          
| 11 May 2010                                  
| Labour
|
|-
! style="background-color: " | 
| Hugo Swire
| 
| 12 May 2010                            
| 4 September 2012                                  
| Conservative
|
|-
! style="background-color: " | 
| Mike Penning
| 
| 4 September 2012  
| 7 October 2013                                                              
| Conservative
|
|-
! style="background-color: " | 
| Andrew Robathan
| 
| 7 October 2013    
| 14 July 2014                                                              
| Conservative
|
|-
! style="background-color: " | 
| Andrew Murrison
| 
| 14 July 2014      
| 12 May 2015                                                              
| Conservative
|
|-
! style="background-color: " | 
| Ben Wallace
| 
| 12 May 2015        
| 17 July 2016                                                              
| Conservative
|
|-
! style="background-color: " | 
| Kris Hopkins
| 
| 17 July 2016          
| 9 June 2017                                                              
| Conservative
|
|-
! style="background-color: " | 
| vacant
| 
| 9 June 2017            
| 9 January 2018                                                              
| 
|
|-
! style="background-color: " | 
| Shailesh Vara
| 
| 9 January 2018 
| 15 November 2018                                                                        
| Conservative
|
|-
! style="background-color: " | 
| John Penrose
| 
| 16 November 2018  
| 25 July 2019                                                                        
| Conservative
|
|-
! style="background-color: " | 
| Nick Hurd
| 
| 25 July 2019    
| 16 December 2019                                                                        
| Conservative
|
|-
! style="background-color: " | 
| Robin Walker
| 
| 13 February 2020
| 16 September 2021                                                                        
| Conservative
|
|-
! style="background-color: " |
| Conor Burns
| 
| 16 September 2021
| 6 September 2022
| Conservative
|
|-
! style="background-color: " |
| Steve Baker
| 
| 6 September 2022 
| Incumbent
| Conservative
|
|-

Northern Ireland Office junior ministers